Aliabad-e Olya (also Romanized as ‘Alīābād-e ‘Olyā) is a village in Rudbar Rural District, in the Central District of Rudbar-e Jonubi County, Kerman Province, Iran. In 2006, its population was 655, in 150 families.

References 

Populated places in Rudbar-e Jonubi County